Carl Hession is an Irish composer, arranger and pianist. His background includes many elements of his education in both traditional and modern (including jazz) and classical music.

Originally from Galway, Ireland, he participated in competitions at various Fleadhs throughout the country. He has All Ireland titles to his credit as a soloist and as a member of duets and trios with flute player Matt Molloy and accordion player Joe Burke. He studied classical piano at University College Cork, where he completed a B. A. in music, specialising in keyboard improvisation. He then performed with violin virtuoso Stéphane Grappelli.

Hession played with the ceili band Shaskeen, with whom he recorded several albums, and with Paul Brock's band Moving Cloud. He also worked with traditional musician friends Frankie Gavin and Joe Derrane and jazz/blues singer Mary Coughlan. With Gavin he recorded The Full Score (TARA 4020). Gavin also played on Hession's album Ceol Inne Ceol Inniu - Old Time New Time, along with Jackie Daly, Steve Cooney, Kevin Crawford and others. He also made recordings with jazz guitarist Louis Stewart.

For several years he was part of the Rhythm of the Dance team with the National Dance Company of Ireland.

Hession has written and arranged compositions for a number of orchestras and ensembles and collaborated with Aidan O'Carroll on the album Songs My Mother Taught Me.

Hession was a music teacher at various schools in Galway County, including Coláiste Iognáid, Galway, and most recently at Yeats College Galway, after which he commenced his retirement.

Select discography 
With Shaskeen

The Shaskeen, Release Records BRL 4053.
Green Groves of Erin. Traditional Irish Music and Song, Release Records XRL5001
The Ash Plant, Release Records XRL5005
Traditional Irish Music, Release Records. Audiocassette, 12 tracks.

Others

 Celtic Aura - Irish Traditional Music - compilation - 1990
 Mo Chairdin - with Paul Brock and Manus McGuire
 Old Time, New Time - 1995
 Moving Cloud - 1995
 Return to Inis Mór - 1996
 Tra Water's Edge - 1997
 Fox Glove - with Moving Cloud - 1998
 Mega Celtique
 Joe Derrane with Carl Hession
 Songs my Mother Taught Me - by Aidan O'Carroll
 Heart of Ireland - Collection of Celtic Songs - Compilation - 1998
 Shamrocks & Holy - An Irish Christmas Celebration - compilation - 2000

References

Year of birth missing (living people)
Living people
Irish composers
Irish pianists
21st-century Irish people
Irish educators
Irish songwriters
People from County Galway
21st-century pianists